Peninsula Strikers Football Club is an Australian soccer club based in Melbourne, Victoria currently playing in the Victorian State League Division 2. Predominantly supported by Frankston, they play at the Centenary Park in Frankston, Victoria. Peninsula Strikers also have a junior club by the name of Peninsula Strikers Junior FC. In 2019, Peninsula Strikers Junior FC was one of the thirteen new teams added to the Junior Boys National Premier Leagues competition in Victoria.

They were founded in 1975

History
Peninsula Strikers FC

Frankston Strikers Soccer Club was formed officially in December 1993 with the amalgamation of 25-year-old Karingal United Soccer Club and 6-year-old Frankston United Soccer Club and Frankston United Junior Soccer Club.

Talks between some committee members from all clubs began many months before that and the main aims were to:
a) Unify fragmented soccer interests in Frankston area
b) Provide better facilities for members and their families
c) Open the opportunity of advancement for the club

1993 
Meetings were held on 6 October 1993 when the decision to amalgamate was made by majority vote by all three clubs. The final Annual General Meetings were held a short time later in support of the amalgamation.

On Friday 26 November 1993 the inaugural General Meeting of the new club was held in the McClelland Drive Clubrooms. A steering committee was formed comprising members from all clubs and this was to be the basis of the new committee to guide the club through its first year. Frankston Soccer Club officially commenced operation on 1 December 1993. View newspaper article
First business of the steering committee was to create a new image for the club resulting in the name change to Frankston Strikers Soccer Club and new club colours of green and gold.
The enthusiasm generated by the merger was evident by the support being received from the Victorian Soccer Federation, the Frankston City and local Council and Government representatives, with the City Council showing their support and confidence in the new club with an extensive renovation and upgrade of the ground.

1995–2006 
In 1995 the Frankston City completed a $120,000 restructure of the playing surface at Centenary Park which is a dedicated soccer complex of similar design to Lakeside Stadium, home of South Melbourne Soccer Club. The playing surface has been designated an "A" status by the Council and receives top priority maintenance throughout the year. The Club developed member and spectator facilities to ensure that the complex will meet all criteria for promotion through the Leagues. The complex is one of the finest sporting spectator facilities on the peninsula. View Ground Picture 1, View Ground Picture 2

The Club took the first step in reaching their aims by earning promotion from Division 4 in 1994 to State League Division 3 in 1995 where they finished the season very strongly in 3rd position. 
The Club won the 1996 Division 3 Premiership and finished third in Division 2 in 1997
Fifth in Division 2 in 1998 and fourth in Division 2 in 1999, first in Division 2 in 2000, 11th in Division 1 in 2001 and relegated, 8th Division 2 South-East in 2002, 4th Division 2 South-East 2003, 11th Division 2 South-East 2004 and relegated, 10th Division 3 South East 2005 and 11th Division 3 South East 2006.

The local community have shown their support through good attendances at home games at Centenary Park. The Club is always aiming to build its supporter base from amongst the local community.
Additionally, major long term commitments have been developed with several large sponsors which will guarantee the sound financial structure of the Club for the future.

2007 
At the club's AGM George announced that he had had discussions with Peninsula Junior Soccer Club re-amalgamation which would guarantee a strong junior section and the possibility that some of these players would eventually play senior soccer.
This move has eventuated with great success.
The climate really hit home over the next few months no rain and all watering of grounds prohibited, the result was that the grass died and the local council informed the club that for 2007 they would be relocated to Ballam Park.

Perhaps it was meant to be that on his retirement game Steve Keenan scored the winning goal.m Great celebrations went on for weeks. The 2008 season would see the club in division 2 S.E. and, due to the council having put in summer grass which is drought resistant, would return to their home ground at McClelland Drive.

2008 

Season 2008 had promised to see the continued good fortune of the club, all the club coaches both firsts and reserves had been reappointed, pre-season began in December at the Monash hockey centre and all the squad of 2007 started training, however after the Xmas break and the start of training in January the players had changed dramatically, perhaps to much celebrating had caused players to retire or jump ship for more money at another club. George and Dougie began the process of signing replacements. Sad to say the new players could not come to terms with the higher football level. It was to be some time before the club picked up points. The season did not get any better, supporters were great but rued the loss of so many players from the title-winning side. The higher the league the harder it is, money being a prime factor for whom a player signs, and so Peninsula could not attract better players able to deal with the higher class of football. The end of the season found the club second bottom of the league and to return to the third division in 2009.

2009 
The seventeen goals that Negus scored ensured a good season, after being relegated it is sometimes hard to get motivation going but in a fourth-place finish the coaches had done just that. The club hoped now for some stability in the club with the hope they could build on the season. That proved wishful thinking and as fast as one season was finishing another just around the corner the club lost both senior coaches plus a lot of players who went with them.

Billy Armour who had been signed by the club at the latter part of 2009 was appointed player-coach for the coming season.

2011 
So 2011 saw Billy Wright an ex-New Zealand International appointed as coach, Billy had previously coached Nunawading also in the league and so he already knew a lot about the club. Billy was to bring a few players with him but because of distance, some left after a few weeks of first team training. Once again the usual turnover in players occurred pre-season, so more players needed to be signed, and overall through the season they struggled, they had no depth and the supporter base put up with the best they could offers. Once again the club finished near the bottom of the league.

2012 
Jamie Skelly who had played in the title-winning team of a few years ago was appointed coach for 2012. A young coach who had learned his trade as Langwarrins under 21 side coach his credentials were excellent, not only that he brought with him many good players from that club, this time they would stay for the season. It should be mentioned here that reserve stalwart coach Dave Reid was still looking after the young hopefuls in the reserve side. On reflection the season did not go to the plan that Jamie had hoped for, consistency in matches did not occur and the team at times never lived up to itself, mixed results went with us throughout the year, injuries robbed us of vital players in the wrong games. Nevertheless, they reached a creditable position in the top half of the league at season's end, the youngsters also finished near the top. Overall there were hopes for a season to build on in 2013.

2013 
Hurricane winds were to sweep through the club pre-season Jamie Skelly assured of his position by the previous committee was ousted by the new incoming committee who thought a change in direction was the way to go.
Dave Reid was appointed coach with the view of putting out a team most of whom had learnt their soccer coming through from the junior ranks.
Jamie's departure also saw the exodus of most of their best players in revolt at the decision to sack him. It was to turn out to be a long season, the usual highly-thought-of soccer on the field disappeared to alarming levels and the crowds did the same. The players on the field did their best but at the end of the season found themselves in a playoff with Sandringham to determine if they were to be relegated.
In a nail-biting game they survived and everyone looked forward to a more successful season in 2014

2014 
Having been reappointed for 2014 Dave Reid managed to secure some new players for the club in the opening game of the season at Seaford expectations were high and despite a loss, many thought that the club could do well.  At the halfway mark of the season, Dave Reid tended his resignation and Billy Rae was appointed the new coach, his approach to the players was give ninety minutes of soccer or you can leave the club. 
At the end of the season, they found themselves second bottom on the ladder and every likelihood that they would be playing in State League Three in 2015.
It was with a great sigh of relief on hearing that Eastern Lions were going to join the new Victorian soccer competition the Federation had canvassed other clubs into joining the league that was now to enter its second season, amazingly Nunawading who finished below ourselves also decided to join, the Lions move meant a vacancy would occur that they could fill and stay in the same league.

2015 
The club's new committee also decided on appointing a new coach Craig Lewis who gained a lot of respect as a player at Strikers some years ago, accepted the challenge. Little did he know what would face him at those early training sessions very few players from either the firsts or the reserve squads from 2014 came back and in some desperation began to seek new players from contacts that he had. Players came from many areas and yes by the first game they had two teams. To summarise the season Craig established some stability in the club, again it would not be a really good season however the first eleven finished mid table which with everything that had occurred throughout the season was an excellent result. Sad to say the usually good reserve side struggled all season on some occasions not even able to field a full side. Billy Buchanan who had returned from Scotland during the year took over the coaching role when Jimmy Stewart decided to relinquish the job, both these guys were dedicated people but they simply did not have the players and they were cellar dwellers all season. The seeds, however, have been sown for next season and provided they could retain the majority of the players season 2016 could be a lot brighter.

2016 
The reappointment of Craig Lewis as coach, Billy Buchanan as his assistant together with two very experienced ex-players Mark Duff and Graham Watson looking after a very young reserve side the coaching side of the club looked in very good hands. Added to this was that the majority of last year's squad were back. 
Off the park president Mark or Chopper Brandon has worked hard with a very small committee behind him to get us new floodlights, two new pitches behind the grandstand and grants for extending the club rooms giving us extra changing rooms and other changes which can only improve the club. 
The introduction of a girls’ team in the via and in their first season gained promotion. The metro team also had a good year and will be looking at promotion for 2017.
The best called veterans team eclipsed all again and won the league and cup double. 
Clayton Lee once again was the rock at the club and once more showed himself to be a great clubman.

2017 
2017 will go down as perhaps the most disastrous season in the club's existence, though much was made pre-season that the squad of players assembled would be pushing the club for promotion. However, at the end of the day they were relegated for only the second time in the club's history.
Where did it all go wrong initial coach Craig Lewis had thought he had found not only the right players but a good balance in the squad, for the first time the club signed three overseas Visa players.
Of the three Danny and Raph who took on the captain's role saw out the season but Leandro chose to leave early in the season for more money from another club. 
Graham Watson took on the coaching role of the reserve team.
Several of the players did get a chance for first-team soccer and hopefully, the club can benefit from this next year. Results were very mixed some poor team performances.
Dave McKinney is to be congratulated on all the youngsters showing in Metro 4 Division some really good performances, Josh Vega who scored well over forty goals in his season.

Marty Moore once again coached the girls team for another season.
The Sunday Celebrities team never let the club down. The Bayside team have been a benchmark for all the teams who compete in the over 35's competition their records will never be beaten but boys thank you for flying that flag again so high for the club.

2018 
The club has used between seventy and eighty players either in the reserve side on in their first eleven side this season. Four first-team coaches only Graham (Winker) Watson remained steadfast in coaching the reserve squad.
Trevor Johnston once again took on the Presidents job and together with the committee Andy O'Dell was appointed the new club coach, he had had a great career coaching Altona City and everything in the club looked rosy. The club again gained Visa players mainly from the UK plus Andy brought some good players with him, Danny Brooks remained from the intake of last years Visa crop. 
The new coach quit before round 1 to return to his previous club for more money, not only did he go but players went with him.
This was to be the start of many comings and goings which were to dog the club for months ahead leading to the aforementioned turnover in coaches and players
Trevor was working hard to keep everything going off the pitch and must have been wondering at times where to turn next.
Salvation in the name of Jamie Skelly sacked by Cranbourne Comets he was approached to coach at Strikers he brought with him two assistants, Ben Caffrey and Joe Donaghy Jnr, but more importantly, good seasoned players.
Jamie was approached to take on an assistant's role at nearby Langwarrin an offer he could not turn down that club being a much higher league than ourselves.
For the first time in a while there is now no representation in the Bayside competition. The over 35s side had to withdraw from their league due to lack of players.

2019 
New Year New coach  –  Danny Verdun brings with him his assistant Neil Standish.

Divisional History

Achievements

League

International players

Individual awards

Rivalries

Seaford United
These two clubs first met in 1995 in State League Division Three where both games were draws (2-2 and 3-3), 20 years later they met again in 2014 in State 2 league.

In round 22 in 2016 was probably the low point in the rivalry where strikers lost 0-8 and from memory many red cards.

 Games: 8
 Strikers Wins: 2
 Seaford Wins 3
 Draws: 3
 Strikers Goals: 20
 Seaford goals: 31

Frankston Pines
These 2 clubs first met in 1997 in State League Division 3

 Games: 6
 Strikers Wins: 2
 Pines Wins 3
 Draws: 2
 Strikers Goals: 9
 Pines goals: 7

Stadium

Peninsula Strikers Play at Centenery Park Frankston

Competition timeline

Managers

  Russell Black (1994–2004)
  William Armour (2005)
  Billy McArthur (2006)
  George Hughes (2006–2009)
  William Armour (2010) 
  Billy Wright (2011)
  Jamie Skelly (2012)
  Dave Reid (2013–2014)
  William Rae (2014)
   Craig Lewis (2015–2017)
   Billy Buchanan (2017)
   Willie Raynes (2017)
  Andy O'Dell(2018)
   Jamie Paterson (2018)
   Lenny Greenanl (2018)
   Jamie Skelly (2018)
   Danny Verdun (2019)
   Paul Williams (2020-2021 )
   Donn Delany (2022- )

References

External links
Official website
Football Federation Victoria Official website

Soccer clubs in Melbourne
Victorian State League teams
Association football clubs established in 1975
1975 establishments in Australia
Sport in the City of Frankston
Frankston, Victoria